Hybrid Ice is a rock band from Danville, Pennsylvania, most notable for its song "Magdelene" released on the album Hybrid Ice in 1982, which became a regional radio hit at the time. "Magdelene" was later covered by Boston on their 1994 album Walk On. In 1984, with two sold out shows, Hybrid Ice was the first rock band ever to play at the Bloomsburg Fair.

Live performances 
Hybrid Ice has toured with many notable musical acts, such as Foreigner, Kansas, Joan Jett, Bad Company, The Beach Boys, Steppenwolf, The Edgar Winter Group, Ted Nugent, and Lita Ford, as well as several others. More recently they have played with Jimi Jamison of Survivor, John Cafferty of the Beaver Brown Band, Derek St. Holmes of the Ted Nugent band, and Kevin Chalfant of the Journey Experience. Hybrid Ice also played the "Legends of Rock" Cruise for 2015 through 2017.

Personnel

Current
 Galen "Rusty" Foulke - lead vocals, guitar, keyboards
 Chris Alburger – lead vocals, guitar, keyboards
 Rick Klinger – drums, vocals
 Bob Richardson – keyboards, vocals, bass, drums
 Jason Shaffer – bass.

Former
 Jeff Willoughby – bass
 Keith Hutcheson – lead vocals
 David Lee Kennedy – lead vocals, bass
 Kevin Collins – lead vocals
 Bernie Garzio – bass, lead vocals
 John Hartman (deceased) – lead vocals, keyboards, guitar
 Kit Kelley – keyboards
 Webb Kline – guitar
 Tom Harvey (deceased) – guitar, vocals
 Scott Adams – lead vocals
 Woody Wolfe – guitar
 Rick Shaffer (deceased) – guitar, vocals.

Discography
Brigg (1973) (As "Brigg", contains three tracks by Hybrid Ice)
Hybrid Ice (1982)
No Rules (1988)
Mind's Eye (2009).

References

External links
 Official Website
 

Progressive rock musical groups from Pennsylvania
Musical groups established in 1969